Su Zent (born March 25, 1996 in Istanbul, Turkey) is a Turkish volleyball player. She plays for Sarıyer Belediyesi Spor Kulübü.

Career
On 14 May 2021, she signed a 1-year contract with the Galatasaray Women's Volleyball Team.

References

External links
Player profile at Volleybox.net

1996 births
Volleyball players from Istanbul
Living people
Turkish women's volleyball players
Galatasaray S.K. (women's volleyball) players
Beşiktaş volleyballers
Türk Hava Yolları volleyballers
PTT Spor Kulübü volleyballers